Neophaedimus is a genus of beetles belonging to the subfamily Cetoniinae.

Species:

Neophaedimus auzouxi

References

Cetoniinae
Scarabaeidae genera